Józef Szajna (13 March 1922 in Rzeszów, Poland – 24 June 2008 in Warsaw) was a Polish set designer, director, playwright, theoretician of the theatre, painter and graphic artist.

During the Second World War and occupation of Poland, Szajna was a prisoner of the German concentration camps Auschwitz and Buchenwald.

See also 
 Centre of Polish Sculpture

Further reading
 Archives and art collection at the Auschwitz-Birkenau State Museum in Oświęcim.
 Bodek, Andrzej, ed.  Reminiszenzen: ein Environment von Prof. Jósef Szajna: zum 50. Jahrestag der Befreiung von Auschwitz-Birkenau. Frankfurt am Main, 1995.
 Archives and art collection at the Buchenwald Memorial Museum, Weimar.
 Madeyski, Jerzy and Andrzej Zurowski.  Józef Szajna: plastyka, teatr. Warsaw, 1992.
 Milton, Sybil and Janet Blatter.  Art of the Holocaust. New York, 1981.
 Sybil Milton interviews and conversations with Józef Szajna at Warsaw 1980 and 1995, 
 Auschwitz 1988, and Venice 1990.
 Oleksy, Krystyna, ed.  Swiat Józefa Szajny. Oświęcim, 1995.
 Józef Szajna: Appell: Geschichtszeichen und Kunstwerk in der Dauerausstellung zur 
 Geschichte des Konzentrationslagers Buchenwald. Weimar, 1995.
 Szajna, Józef. "Replika - Erinnerungen: Künstleriche Protest-Aktion gegen den Terror," and "Gespräch zwischen Detlef Hoffmann und Józef Szajna," in Detlef Hoffmann and Karl Ermert, eds.  Kunst und Holocaust: Loccumer Protokolle, No. 14 (1990), 74–99.

External links
 Information and pictures regarding the Józef Szajna's stay in the Auschwitz and Buchenwald Concentration Camps during WWII
 Video interview with Józef Szajna Windows Media Version
 Józef Szajna at culture.pl
 Biography of Józef Szajna at Polish Culture NYC
 Józef Szajna's contribution to the webpages of a "Why Auschwitz? Why Kolyma? Why Kosovo?" competition organised by Znak, a Polish Christian Culture Foundation
 Article occasioned by a December 2002 exhibition Jozef Szajna - Theater
 Articles about Józef Szajna - Teatr im. Siemaszkowej in Rzeszów
 Art and Auschwitz - Józef Szajna's  "The Roll Call Lasted Very Long ... My Feet Hurt Very Much", ca. 1944-45 ca. 1944-45 (in Spanish)

Works
 Works by Józef Szajna at Gallery Katarzyna Napiorkowska in Warsaw and Brussels

1922 births
2008 deaths
Polish sculptors
Polish male sculptors
Polish theatre directors
20th-century Polish dramatists and playwrights
Polish male dramatists and playwrights
People from Rzeszów
Auschwitz concentration camp survivors
Buchenwald concentration camp survivors
20th-century sculptors
20th-century Polish male writers
Recipient of the Meritorious Activist of Culture badge